The 2008 Porsche Tennis Grand Prix was a tennis tournament played on indoor hard courts. It was the 31st edition of the Porsche Tennis Grand Prix, and was part of the Tier II Series of the 2008 WTA Tour. It took place at the Porsche Arena in Stuttgart, Germany, from 27 September through 5 October 2008. Second-seeded Jelena Janković won the singles title.

Finals

Singles

 Jelena Janković defeated  Nadia Petrova 6–4, 6–3
 It was Janković's 2nd singles title of the year, and her 8th overall.

Doubles

 Anna-Lena Grönefeld /  Patty Schnyder defeated  Květa Peschke /  Rennae Stubbs 6–2, 6–4

External links
Official website
Singles, Doubles and Qualifying Singles draws

Porsche Tennis Grand Prix
2008
2008 in German tennis
2000s in Baden-Württemberg
Porsch